Babaha (also Romanized as Bābāhā) is a village in Sanjabi Rural District, Kuzaran District, Kermanshah County, Kermanshah Province, Iran. At the 2006 census, its population was 82, in 21 families.

References 

Populated places in Kermanshah County